The Constitutional Court of the Kingdom of Thailand is an independent Thai court created by the 1997 Constitution with jurisdiction over the constitutionality of parliamentary acts, royal decrees, draft legislation, as well as the appointment and removal of public officials and issues regarding political parties. The current court is part of the judicial branch of the Thai national government.

The court, along with the 1997 Constitution, was dissolved and replaced by a Constitutional Tribunal in 2006 following the 2006 Thai coup d'état. While the Constitutional Court had 15 members, seven from the judiciary and eight selected by a special panel, the Constitution Tribunal had nine members, all from the judiciary. A similar institution, consisting of nine members, was again established by the 2007 Constitution.

The Constitutional Court has provoked much public debate, both regarding the court's jurisdiction and composition as well as the initial selection of justices. A long-standing issue has been the degree of control exerted by the judiciary over the court.

The decisions of the court are final and not subject to appeal. Its decisions bind every state organ, including the National Assembly, the Council of Ministers, and other courts.

The various versions of the court have made several significant decisions. These include the 1999 decision that deputy minister of agriculture Newin Chidchop could retain his cabinet seat after being sentenced to imprisonment for defamation; the 2001 acquittal of Thaksin Shinawatra for filing an incomplete statement regarding his assets with the National Anti-Corruption Commission; the 2003 invalidation of Jaruvan Maintaka's appointment as auditor-general; the 2007 dissolution of the Thai Rak Thai political party; the 2014 removal of prime minister Yingluck Shinawatra from office, the dissolution of the Thai Raksa Chart Party before the March 2019 election, and the dissolution of the Future Forward Party in 2020.

The FY2019 budget of the Constitutional Court is 223.7 million baht. , its president is Nurak Marpraneet.

Origins and controversy

Drafting of the 1997 Constitution 
The creation of the Constitutional Court was the subject of much debate during the 1996–1997 drafting of the 1997 Constitution of Thailand. Senior judges opposed the concept on the grounds that constitutional and judicial review should remain a prerogative of the Supreme Court and that a Constitutional Court would create a fourth branch of government more powerful than the judiciary, legislature, or executive. Judges stated their fear over political interference in the selection and impeachment of judges. The Constitution Drafting Assembly (CDA) eventually made several concessions regarding the composition and powers of the Court.

Jurisdiction 
The constitution did not give the Constitutional Court the authority to overrule a final judgment of the Supreme Court. An affected party, or a court, could request the opinion from the Constitutional Court if it believed a case involved a constitutional issue. The court where the initial action was pending would stay its proceedings until the Constitutional Court issued its decision. Constitutional court decisions would have no retroactive effect on previous decisions of the regular courts.

The constitution also did not give the Constitutional Court the authority to rule on any case in which the constitution did not specifically delegate an agency the power to adjudicate.

Impeachment 
The constitution allowed individual justices to be the subject of impeachment proceedings with the vote of one-fourth of the members of the House or with the approval of 50,000 petitioners. A vote of three-fifths of the Senate is required for impeachment. Earlier drafts had required votes of only 10% of the combined House and Senate to call for a vote of impeachment, and votes of three-fifths of the combined parliament to dismiss a justice.

Appointment 
The constitution gave the judiciary a strong influence over the composition of the Constitutional Court. Originally, the court was to have nine justices including six legal experts and three political science experts. A panel of 17 persons would propose 18 names from which parliament would elect the nine justices. The panel president would be the president of the Supreme Court, the panel itself would have included four political party representatives. The CDA finally compromised and allowed seven of the justices to be selected by the judiciary, while the remaining eight justices would be selected by the Senate from a list of Supreme Court nominees.

Appointment of the first Constitutional Court 
The appointment of the first Constitutional Court following the promulgation of the constitution in 1997 was four month controversy pitting the senate against the Supreme Court. A key issue was the senate's authority to review the backgrounds of judicial nominees and reject nominees deemed inappropriate or unqualified.

Appointment of Amphorn Thongprayoon 
After receiving the Supreme Court's list of nominees, the senate created a committee to review the nominees' credentials and backgrounds. On 24 November 1997, the Senate voted to remove the name of Supreme Court Vice-president Amphorn Thongprayoon, on the grounds that his credentials were dubious and on allegations that he had defaulted on three million baht in debt. The Supreme Court was furious, arguing the constitution did not empower the senate to do background checks or to reject Supreme Court nominees. The Supreme Court requested a ruling from the Constitutional Tribunal chaired by the House speaker. On 8 January 1998, in a six to three vote, the Tribunal ruled the Senate did not have the authority to do background checks or reject the Supreme Court's nominees. The Tribunal ruled that the Senate's review powers were limited to examining the records of the nominees and electing half of those nominees for appointment.

Immediately after the Supreme Court filed its request to the Tribunal, Justice Amphorn withdrew his name. After the Tribunal's ruling, the Supreme Court elected justice Jumpol na Songkhla on 9 January 1998 to replace Amphorn. The Senate ignored the Tribunal's ruling and proceeded to review Jumphol's background and delayed a vote to accept his nomination for seven days so that the Senate could evaluate Jumphol. Finding no problems, the Senate acknowledged his appointment to the court on 23 January 1998.

Appointment of Ukrit Mongkolnavin 
The appointment of former Senate and Parliament president Ukrit Mongkolnavin was especially problematic. The Senate had initially elected Ukrit from the list of ten legal specialists nominated by the selection panel, despite claims by democracy activists that Ukrit was unqualified to guard the constitution because he had served dictators while president of parliament under the 1991-1992 military government of the National Peacekeeping Council.

Stung by the Senate rejection of Amphorn Thongprayoon, the two Bangkok Civil Court judges, Sriampron Salikhup and Pajjapol Sanehasangkhom, petitioned the Constitutional Tribunal to disqualify Ukrit on a legal technicality. They argued that Ukrit only had an honorary professorship at Chulalongkorn University, while the 1997 Constitution specifically specifies that a nominee, if not meeting other criteria, must be at least a professor. Echoing the Senate's rejection of Amphorn, the judges also alleged that Ukrit was involved in a multi-million baht lawsuit over a golf course. On 10 January 1998 the tribunal ruled that the judges were not affected parties and therefore they had no right to request a ruling. Nevertheless, the parliament's president invoked his power as chairman of the tribunal to ask the Senate to reconsider Ukrit's nomination.

On 19 January 1998, the Senate reaffirmed Ukrit's qualifications, noting that his professorship was special only because he was not a government official. Under Chulalongkorn's regulations, he had the academic status of a full professor.

This position inflamed activists and the judiciary, and prompted the parliament president on 21 January to invoke his authority under Article 266 of the 1997 Constitution to order the Constitutional Tribunal to consider the issue. On 8 February, in a four to three vote, the tribunal ruled that Ukrit's special professorship did not qualify him for a seat on the Constitutional Court. The tribunal noted that Chulalongkorn's criteria for honorary professorship were different from its criteria for academic professors, as intended by the constitution. The Senate ended up electing Komain Patarapirom to replace Ukrit.

Jurisdiction 
Under the 2007 Constitution, the court is competent to address the following:

Composition

1997 Constitution
The Constitutional Court was modeled after the Constitutional Court of Italy. According to the 1997 Constitution, the Court had 15 members, all serving nine year terms and appointed by the king upon senatorial advice:
 Five were judges of the Supreme Court of Justice (SCJ) and selected by the SCJ Plenum through secret ballot.
 Two were judges of the Supreme Administrative Court (SAC) and selected by the SAC Plenum through secret ballot.
 Five were experts in law approved by the Senate after having been selected by a special panel. Such panel consisted of the SCJ president, four deans of law, four deans of political science, and four representatives of the political parties whose members are representatives.
 Three were experts in political science approved by the Senate after having been selected by the same panel.

2006 Constitution 
According to the 2006 Constitution, the Constitutional Tribunal was established to replace the Constitutional Court which had been dissolved by the Council for Democratic Reform. The Tribunal had nine members as follows:
 The SCJ president as president.
 The SAC president as vice-president.
 Five SCJ judges selected by the SCJ plenum through secret ballot.
 Two SAC judges selected by the SAC plenum through secret ballot.

Members of the Tribunal

2007 Constitution 

After the Constitutional Court was abolished by the Council for Democratic Reform and was replaced by the Constitutional Tribunal under the 2006 Constitution, the 2007 Constitution reestablishes the Constitutional Court and makes various changes to it. The Court is back with greater vigour and is also empowered to introduce to the National Assembly the draft laws concerning the Court itself.
 
Under the 2007 Constitution, the Constitutional Court has nine members, all serving for nine year terms and appointed by the king with senatorial advice:

 Three are SCJ judges and are selected by the SCJ plenum through secret ballot.
 Two are SAC judges and are selected by the SAC plenum through secret ballot.
 Two are experts in law approved by the Senate after having been selected by a special panel. Such panel is composed of the SCJ president, the SAC president, the president of the House of Representatives, the opposition leader and one of the chiefs of the constitutional independent agencies (chief ombudsman, president of the election commission, president of the National Anti-Corruption Commission or president of the State Audit Commission).
 Two are experts in political science, public administration or other field of social science and are approved by the Senate after having been selected by the same panel.

Members of the court

2017 Constitution 
After 2014 Thai coup d'état, the court had not been dissolved. Until the 2017 constitution was in effect, the judges from the 2007 constitution court continued to work on the 2017 court.

Members of the court

Key decisions

Chuan-government emergency decrees during the 1997 economic crisis

Unconstitutionality of emergency economic decrees 
In its first decision, the Court ruled on the constitutionality of four emergency executive decrees issued by the Chuan government to deal with the Asian financial crisis. The government had issued the decrees in early-May 1998 to expand the role of the Financial Restructuring Authority and the Assets Management Corporation, to settle the debts of the Financial Institutions Development Fund through the issue of 500 billion baht in bonds, and to authorize the ministry of finance to seek 200 billion baht in overseas loans. The opposition New Aspiration Party (NAP) did not have the votes to defeat the bills, and therefore, on the last day of debate, invoked Article 219 of the Constitution to question the constitutionality of an emergency decree.

The NAP argued that since there was no emergency nor necessary urgency (under Article 218(2)), the government could not issue any emergency decrees. Article 219, however, specifically notes the constitutionality of an emergency decree can be questioned only on Article 218(1) concerning the maintenance of national or public safety, national economic security, or to avert public calamity. The government, fearing further economic damage if the decree were delayed, opposed the Court's acceptance of the complaint, as the opposition clearly had failed to cite the proper constitutional clause. The Court wished to set a precedent, however, demonstrating it would accept petitions under Article 219, even if technically inaccurate. Within a day it ruled that it was obvious to the general public that the nation was in an economic crisis, and that the decrees were designed to assist with national economic security in accordance with Article 218(1). The decrees were later quickly approved by Parliament.

The NAP's last minute motion damaged its credibility, and made it unlikely that Article 219 will be invoked unless there is a credible issue and the issue is raised and discussed at the beginning of parliamentary debate, rather than at the last-minute before a vote.

On the other hand, a precedent was established by the Court that it would accept all petitions under Article 219 to preserve Parliament's right to question the constitutionality of emergency executive decrees.

Treaty status of IMF letters of intent 
The NAP later filed impeachment proceedings with the National Anti-Corruption Commission (NACC) against prime minister Chuan Leekpai and the minister of finance Tarrin Nimmanahaeminda for violation of the Constitution. The NAP argued that the letter of intent that the government signed with the International Monetary Fund (IMF) to secure emergency financial support was a treaty, and that Article 224 of the Constitution stipulated that the government must receive prior consent from Parliament to enter a treaty.

The NACC determined the issue concerned a constitutional interpretation and petitioned the Constitutional Court for an opinion. The Court ruled the IMF letters were not treaties, as internationally defined, because they were unilateral documents from the Thai government with no rules for enforcement or provisions for penalty. Moreover, the IMF itself had worded the letters in a way that stated that the letters were not contractual agreements.

Appointment of Jaruvan Maintaka as auditor-general 
On 24 June 2003, a petition was filed with the Constitutional Court seeking its decision on the constitutionality of Jaruvan Maintaka's appointment by the Senate as auditor-general. Jaruvan was one of three nominees for the position of auditor-general in 2001, along with Prathan Dabpet and Nontaphon Nimsomboon. Prathan received five votes from the eight person State Audit Commission (SAC) while Jaruvan received three votes. According to the constitution, State Audit Commission chairman Panya Tantiyavarong should have submitted Prathan's nomination to the Senate, as he received the majority of votes. However, on 3 July 2001, the SAC chairman submitted a list of all three candidates for the post of auditor-general to the Senate, which later voted to select Khunying Jaruvan Maintaka.

The Constitutional Court ruled on 6 July 2004 that the selection process that led to the appointment of Jaruvan as auditor-general was unconstitutional. The court noted that the constitution empowers the SAC to nominate only one person with the highest number of votes from a simple majority, not three as had been the case. The court stopped short of saying she had to leave her post. However, when the Constitutional Court had ruled on 4 July 2002 that the then Election Commission chairman Sirin Thoopklam's election to the body was unconstitutional, the president of the court noted "when the court rules that the selection [process] was unconstitutional and has to be redone, the court requires the incumbent to leave the post".

Jaruwan refused to resign without a royal dismissal from King Bhumibol Adulyadej. She noted "I came to take the position as commanded by a royal decision, so I will leave the post only when directed by such a decision." The State Audit Commission later nominated Wisut Montriwat, former deputy permanent secretary of the ministry of finance, for the post of auditor-general. The Senate approved the nomination on 10 May 2005. However, King Bhumibol Adulyadej, in an unprecedented move, withheld his royal assent. The National Assembly did not hold a vote to overthrow the royal veto. In October 2005 the Senate rejected a motion to reaffirm her appointment, and instead deferred the decision to the SAC.

On 15 February 2006 the State Audit Commission (SAC) reinstated Auditor-General Khunying Jaruvan Maintaka. Its unanimous decision came after it received a memo from the office of King Bhumibol Adulyadej's principal private secretary, directing that the situation be resolved.

The controversy led many to reinterpret the political and judicial role of the king in Thailand's constitutional monarchy.

Thaksin Shinawatra's alleged conflicts of interest 
In February 2006, 28 Senators submitted a petition to the Constitutional Court calling for the prime minister's impeachment for conflicts of interest and improprieties in the sell-off of Shin Corporation under Articles 96, 216 and 209 of the Thai constitution. The Senators said the prime minister violated the Constitution and was no longer qualified for office under Article 209. However, the Court rejected the petition on 16 February, with the majority judges saying the petition failed to present sufficient grounds to support the prime minister's alleged misconduct.

Political parties dissolution following the April 2006 election

Court rejects flawed oath petition
In September 2019, the court rejected a petition lodged by the Ombudsman of Thailand regarding the incomplete oath recited by Prime Minister Prayut Chan-o-cha and his cabinet in July 2019. The prime minister failed to recite the final sentence of the oath which pledges to uphold and abide by the constitution. The court ruled that it was "not in its authority" to make a ruling on the issue, in effect ruling that vows to uphold the constitution are none of the constitutional court's business.

Future Forward Party dissolution
On 20 November 2019, the court convicted Thanathorn Juangroongruangkit, disqualifying his MP status. On 21 February 2020, Future Forward Party was dissolved in the court ruling, which said that the party was in violation of election laws regarding donations to political parties. The party was loaned 191.2 million baht (about US$6 million) from its leader, Thanathorn, according to the court, counted as a donation. The dissolution order drew criticism from commentators inside and outside the country, who characterized it as part of the military's continued interference in Thai politics, noting that the party's vocal anti-military position made it a target and that the other parties' finances were not similarly scrutinized.

Court rules that Prayut not "state official"
The court ruled in September 2019, that General Prayut, on seizing power in May 2014 with no authorization to do so, answering to no other state official, and holding onto his power only temporarily, could not be considered a state official. The ruling bears on Prayut's eligibility to serve as prime minister.

Court rules that the monarchy reform is to overthrow the state and the monarchy

On 10 November 2021, the court ruled that Arnon, Panupong, and Panusaya of the 2020–2021 Thai protests' 10-point call for reforms of the monarchy in 'Thammasat will not tolerate' rally on 10 August 2020 aimed to overthrow the state and the monarchy in their speeches. The court ordered them and other protest groups to end all monarchy reform movements. The petition was filed by Natthaporn Toprayoon on 3 September 2020.

The court explained that such demands were an “abuse of the rights and freedoms and harmed the state’s security”, but the court did not enforce a punishment on them, ruling on the constitutionality of their demands. Three protest leaders deny seeking to overthrow the monarchy. Evidence submitted by the defence was not examined by the court. Their lawyer and Panusaya walked out of the middle of hearing. The court also rules that sovereign power belongs to the monarchy not the people.

Sunai Phasuk of Human Rights Watch described the ruling as “essentially a judicial coup” that could escalate more legal cases against protesters, possibility a treason. This could lead to an end to Thailand's constitutional monarchy rule and replacing with absolute monarchy. Jonathan Head of BBC described this ruling forcefully shuts down any room in Thailand for public discussion of the monarchy, but private discussion and social media discussion will continue on, regardless of the government efforts to stop. It was seen as another politicised intervention on the side of conservatives, royalists, by the independent court.

On 11 November 2021, the Court website was hacked. Its homepage was renamed to the Kangaroo Court and a YouTube video of a song, Guillotine (It goes Yah) by Death Grips.

Same sex marriage

In 2021, the Court ruled that Section 1448 of the Civil and Commercial Code interpreting marriages as only between women and men is constitutional, but after the release of full ruling, one phrase mentioned that members of the LGBTQ community cannot reproduce, as it is against nature, and they are unlike other animals with unusual behaviours or physical characteristics. The text were deemed by some as sexist and politically incorrect.

See also 

 Constitution
 Constitution of Thailand
 Constitutional economics
 Constitutionalism
 History of Thailand since 2001
 Judiciary
 Jurisprudence
 Rule according to higher law
 Rule of law
 Separation of powers

References

Further reading

In English

In Thai

External links 
 Constitutional Court on Facebook 

Thailand
Constitutional law
Law of Thailand
Constitution of Thailand
Judiciary of Thailand
Government of Thailand
Organizations based in Bangkok
1997 establishments in Thailand
Legal history of Thailand
Courts and tribunals established in 1997
Network monarchy
Controversies in Thailand